Ectoedemia commiphorella is a moth of the family Nepticulidae. It was described by Scoble in 1978. It is known from South Africa (it was described from the Langjan Nature Reserve).

The larvae feed on Commiphora pyracanthoides.

References

Nepticulidae
Endemic moths of South Africa
Moths described in 1978